The Military Canteen of Royal Netherlands Navy (also known as the Marine Societeit Moderlust Ujung) was built in Soerabaja, Dutch East Indies (present-day Surabaya, Indonesia) in 1890. The canteen was a place for socializing and was known as Marine Societeit "Moderlust" (Mud Lust) Ujung after May 1867.

The crew of submarine  visited the canteen during their stay in Soerabaja in 1942. The sub was eventually scuttled ahead of the Japanese advance and was later raised by the Japanese as a "picket hulk" in the harbor.

Societeit clubs were popular in cities across the Dutch East Indies.

References

Buildings and structures in Surabaya
Dutch East Indies
Dutch colonial architecture in Indonesia